Brachycentrus americanus is a species of humpless casemaker caddisfly in the family Brachycentridae. It is found in North America. It is most prolific in the West and Midwest of North America in July and August.

References

Trichoptera
Articles created by Qbugbot
Insects described in 1899